The Alvarez Polliwagen is a 1970s homebuilt aircraft. The aircraft has a combination of many high performance features not typically found in a Volkswagen air-cooled engine-powered homebuilt.

Design and development
The Polliwagen is a low wing, side-by-side configuration, T tailed, retractable tricycle landing gear equipped aircraft with tip tanks. The aircraft was developed and tested with a one quarter scale radio controlled model. Ailerons and flaps are full span. The fuselage is built from composites with foam cores. The aircraft's engine is configured with a turbocharger and constant speed propeller. Entrance is through a swing up canopy.

Specifications (Polliwagen)

See also

References

Homebuilt aircraft